The Symphony No. 5, Washington Mosaics, Op. 57, is an orchestral composition by the Finnish composer Aulis Sallinen, who wrote the piece from 1984–85, revising the finale in 1987. The National Symphony Orchestra, the commissioning institution, premiered the work in 10 October 1985 at the Kennedy Center in Washington, D.C., under the direction of its music director, Mstislav Rostropovich.

Composition

History

Structure 
The symphony is in five movements:

Instrumentation 
According to the publisher, Novello & Co, Symphony No. 5 is scored for the following:
Woodwind: 4 flutes (2 doubling piccolo), 4 oboes, 4 clarinets in B (1 doubling E clarinet, 1 doubling B bass clarinet), 4 bassoons (1 doubling contrabassoon)
Brass: 6 horns in F, 4 trumpets in B, 4 trombones, 1 tuba
Percussion: timpani, 4 percussionists (bass drum, military drum, snare drum, tenor drum, tom-toms, bongo drums, wood blocks, castanets, tam-tam, cymbals, suspended cymbal, triangle, cowbell, glockenspiel, xylophone, vibraphone, marimba, tubular bells)
Strings: violins, violas, cellos, double basses, harp, celesta, piano

Reception

Notable performances 

The Fifth Symphony had its world premiere on 10 October 1985, with Mstislav Rostropovich conducting the National Symphony Orchestra (NSO) at the Kennedy Center; also on the program was Sibelius's tone poem, En saga, and Beethoven's Second Symphony. The Washington Post reviewed the work with ambivalence, calling it a "big, ambitious new symphony" with "genuinely moving moments" that nonetheless was "more intriguing than convincing," its "disjointed brilliance" unable "to resolve emotionally". Three days later, Rostropovich and the NSO played the Fifth Symphony at Avery Fisher Hall in New York, along with Shostakovich's Fifth Symphony and Haydn's Cello Concerto in C major (Rostropovich serving as soloist). On 23 September 1988, Rostropovich and the NSO performed the revised version of the Fifth, again at the Kennedy Center in Washington; also on the program was Mozart's serenade for strings, Eine Kleine Nachtmusik, and Grieg's two Peer Gynt Suites.

The British premiere took place on 15 February 1987, with Okko Kamu conducting the London Philharmonic at the Royal Festival Hall; also on the program was Gounod's St. Cecilia Mass. The performance of Sallinen's Fifth, which commenced London's three-month multi-venue, multi-orchestra 'Spotlight on Finland' music festival, was received positively, with The Financial Times characterizing the work as consisting of "icy fragments of symphonic material [that] have been chipped off to clink and tinkle in Sallinen's structural cocktail shaker". While noting the Fifth Symphony's "allusions to other music" (in particular its "post-Sibelian desolation"), The Sunday Times applauded the "vitality of Sallinen's rhythms and the sheer eventfulness of his scoring," as well as his "imaginative and masterly ... handling of the large orchestra".

Recordings 
To date, Symphony No. 5 has received three recordings, the first of which is from 1987 with Okko Kamu conducting the Helsinki Philharmonic on the Finlandia label. Finnish conductor Ari Rasilainen has also recorded the symphony as part of cpo's compendium of Sallinen's orchestral works. The Fifth Symphony joins the Third (Op. 35, 1975) on the penultimate volume of the cpo series. In his review of this CD (cpo 999970-2), Fanfare's Phillip Scott applauds Rasilainen for "performances of sensitivity and clarity, aided by a stunning recording", albeit played with less obvious irony than DePriest's effort with the Malmö Symphony Orchestra. Calling the Fifth and the Third "the pinnacle of Sallinen's orchestral work", he concludes: "Anyone curious about the symphony in contemporary music should own this [cpo] disc". Writing for the American Record Guide, Paul Cook describes Rasilainen's interpretation of Symphony No. 5 (relative to his handling of the Third) "much more adroit and he gets it exactly right ... Despite my quibbles [on the Third], this is an excellent release and I think the Fifth deserves your attention".

Notes, references, and sources

Notes

References

Sources 

Books

CD liner notes

Journal articles
 
 
 
 

News reports

Symphonies by Aulis Sallinen
1985 compositions
Sallinen 5